Chloe Dao (born June 15, 1972) is an American fashion designer and television personality who lives and works in Houston, U.S. She was the winner of the second season of the reality show Project Runway with a collection of women's evening wear. Many of the pieces in her finale collection featured billowing, voluminous sleeves, removable shrugs and strong brocade prints.

Biography
Dao was born in Pakse, Laos to an ethnic Vietnamese (Kinh) family. During the Vietnamese civil war Dao's parents moved to Thailand to escape the conflict. The family, including Dao, her parents and seven sisters, emigrated to the United States in 1979. Growing up she redesigned vintage clothes; her first original was her senior prom dress.

Education and early career
Dao attended the University of Houston and studied marketing, dropping out after a year and a half. She then enrolled at Houston Community College's design program and at New York's Fashion Institute of Technology (FIT), graduating in 1994 with an associate's degree in pattern-making.

While still at FIT, Dao took a job with Madame Rossuel, a costume couture shop on the Upper East Side of New York City. After graduation, she worked at knit and sportswear company, Finity as a design assistant and patternmaker. Leaving Finity after one year, she took a job with Melinda Eng as a design assistant and production manager, where she stayed for six years.  She then went to work for Catherine Dietlein as an assistant buyer before returning to Houston to open her own boutique, Lot 8.  The name of the store is a reference to the eight Dao sisters in her family. Her clothes have been featured in Lucky magazine as well as in a variety of Texas publications including the Houston Chronicle and Texas Monthly.

Project Runway

During the taping of Project Runway, Dao expressed some reservations about her desire to win the competition. In the end, the judges selected her collection over those by the other finalists: Santino Rice and Daniel Vosovic.

On Project Runway, she won the second episode, "Clothes Off Your Back" and the tenth episode, "Makeover." She was also in the top three in the fifth episode, "Social Scene", the sixth episode, "Window Shopping"; the seventh episode, "On Thin Ice"; and the ninth episode, "Flower Power."  She was also in the bottom two in the eleventh episode, "What's Your Line."

Unlike the winner from season one, Jay McCarroll, Dao accepted the winning prize of $100,000 and the mentorship from Banana Republic.

After Project Runway

Even with the win of PR2, Dao continues to develop and grow her boutique's business in Houston.

In July 2006, she was in a popular Vietnamese music show called Paris By Night. She was also in Paris By Night 84.

In January 2007, Dao's designs were featured in the Smithsonian Asian Pacific American Center in the "Exit Saigon, Enter Little Saigon" exhibit.

Dao's reputation for understanding women and their bodies landed her a contract with Dove as their national spokesperson for the "Sleeveless Ready" campaign.

During Spring 2007 New York Fashion Week, LensCrafters chose Dao as the featured designer and as a panelist along with Tim Gunn, Hal Rubenstein, Bobbie Thomas, and Gretta Monahan to discuss eyewear as the next "it" accessory.

In May 2007, Dao premiered a 13-piece collection on QVC called Simply. Chloe Dao. which sold out during the televised broadcast.

In 2008 her style and modern sensibility led her to partner with Nuo Tech to create a line of mobile technology and travel accessories, available in Spring 2009.

She debuted her wholesale line "DAO Chloe DAO" in March, 2008 at the Dallas Market Center.

In 2013, she became a judge in Project Runway Vietnam season 1.

References

External links
Project Runway Designer Bio: Chloe Dao
Chloe Dao 2007 Interview on Sidewalks Entertainment
Chloe Dao Official Website
Chloe Dao for Nuo Collection website
"The Concierge Questionnaire-Cloe Dao Interview" www.conciergequestionnaire.com 2009-04-17 retrieved 2010-03-03

1972 births
American fashion designers
American women fashion designers
Artists from Houston
Living people
Project Runway (American series) participants
Reality show winners
Laotian expatriates in Thailand
American artists of Vietnamese descent
American people of Vietnamese descent
University of Houston alumni
Fashion Institute of Technology alumni
Laotian emigrants to the United States
Laotian people of Vietnamese descent
21st-century American women